The Dwarves Invented Rock & Roll is an album by the American punk rock band Dwarves, released in 2014. It is the band's ninth full-length original album. The album was released on cassette and CD by Burger Records and vinyl by Recess Records.

Singles
Four singles from the album have been released:
 "Trailer Trash" 7" was released by Recess Records and features the title track from the album, and "Unpredictable", which is also available as a bonus track on the Invented CD.
 "Get Up & Get High" 7" was released by No Balls Records in Germany and features the title track and "Irresistible" from the album, and a cover of the Turbonegro song "Blow Me". 
 "Gentleman Blag" 7" was released by Fat Wreck Chords and features the title track and "Kings of the World" from the album, and "Trisexual" and "Stuck in the Void".
 "Fun to Try" was released by Burger Records for Record Store Day 2015. It features the title track, a remix of "Sluts of the USA" and "Got Them Saints"

All the b-sides are available with the version of the album at the band's bandcamp page.

Track listing

Personnel
 Blag Dahlia  
 HeWhoCannotBeNamed
 Rex Everything
 The Fresh Prince of Darkness
 Josh Freese (credited as "P.F. Freese")
 Dutch Ovens
 Gregory Pecker
 Sgt. Saltpeter 
 Chip Fracture

References

Dwarves (band) albums
2011 albums